Mohiville is a village and a district in the municipality of Hamois, located in the province of Namur, Belgium. 

Prehistoric archaeological remains have been discovered in the area, and a permanent settlement appears to have existed near Mohiville since Merovingian times. During the Middle Ages, the area of the current district was split between several lords. A water mill has existed here since at least 1231; the current mill building bears the date 1743. The current village church dates from 1768. There is also a small , 17th-cnetury château close to Mohiville, the Château de Ry.

References

External links

Former municipalities of Namur (province)